Ochthephilus is a genus of spiny-legged rove beetles in the family Staphylinidae. There are at least 50 described species in Ochthephilus.

Species
These 50 species belong to the genus Ochthephilus:

 Ochthephilus andalusiacus (Fagel, 1957)
 Ochthephilus angustatus (Erichson, 1840)
 Ochthephilus angustior (Bernhauer, 1943)
 Ochthephilus ashei Makranczy, 2014
 Ochthephilus assingi Makranczy, 2014
 Ochthephilus aureus (Fauvel, 1871)
 Ochthephilus biimpressus (Mäklin, 1852)
 Ochthephilus brachypterus Jeannel & Jarrige, 1949
 Ochthephilus californicus Makranczy, 2014
 Ochthephilus carnicus (Scheerpeltz, 1950)
 Ochthephilus columbiensis (Hatch, 1957)
 Ochthephilus corsicus (Fagel, 1956)
 Ochthephilus davidi Makranczy, 2014
 Ochthephilus emarginatus (Fauvel, 1871)
 Ochthephilus enigmaticus Makranczy, 2014
 Ochthephilus filum (Fauvel, 1875)
 Ochthephilus forticornis (Hochhuth, 1860)
 Ochthephilus gusarovi Makranczy, 2014
 Ochthephilus hammondi Makranczy, 2014
 Ochthephilus incognitus Makranczy, 2014
 Ochthephilus indicus Makranczy, 2014
 Ochthephilus itoi Makranczy, 2014
 Ochthephilus jailensis (Scheerpeltz, 1950)
 Ochthephilus kirschenblatti Makranczy, 2014
 Ochthephilus kleebergi Makranczy, 2014
 Ochthephilus legrosi (Jarrige, 1949)
 Ochthephilus loebli Makranczy, 2014
 Ochthephilus masatakai Watanabe, 2007
 Ochthephilus mediterraneus (Scheerpeltz, 1950)
 Ochthephilus merkli Makranczy, 2014
 Ochthephilus omalinus (Erichson, 1840)
 Ochthephilus planus (LeConte, 1861)
 Ochthephilus praepositus Mulsant & Rey, 1878
 Ochthephilus qingyianus Makranczy, 2014
 Ochthephilus ritae Makranczy, 2014
 Ochthephilus rosenhaueri Kiesenwetter, 1850
 Ochthephilus ruteri (Jarrige, 1949)
 Ochthephilus scheerpeltzi (Fagel, 1951)
 Ochthephilus schuelkei Makranczy, 2014
 Ochthephilus strandi (Scheerpeltz, 1950)
 Ochthephilus szarukani Makranczy, 2014
 Ochthephilus szeli Makranczy, 2014
 Ochthephilus tatricus (Smetana, 1967)
 Ochthephilus tibetanus Makranczy, 2014
 Ochthephilus tichomirovae Makranczy, 2014
 Ochthephilus uhligi Makranczy, 2014
 Ochthephilus venustulus (Rosenhauer, 1856)
 Ochthephilus wrasei Makranczy, 2014
 Ochthephilus wunderlei Makranczy, 2014
 Ochthephilus zerchei Makranczy, 2014

References

Further reading

 
 

Oxytelinae
Articles created by Qbugbot